Sciocyrtinus elongatus is a species of beetle in the family Cerambycidae, and the only species in the genus Sciocyrtinus. It was described by Fisher in 1935.

References

Cyrtinini
Beetles described in 1935
Monotypic beetle genera